Aqzhar is a village in Almaty Region of south-eastern Kazakhstan.

External links
Tageo.com
https://www.geonames.org/1526538/aqzhar.html

Populated places in Almaty Region